Al-Salih Hajji (Epithet: Al-Salih Salah Zein al-Din Hajji II), also Haji II, was a Mamluk ruler, and the last ruler of the Bahri dynasty in 1382. He briefly ruled again in 1389, during the advent of the Burji dynasty. He fell hostage to Barquq before the small battle of Marj al-Saffar in 1390. He was the son of Shaban II.

Notes

References
Caroline Williams, Richard Bordeaux Parker, Robin Sabin, Jaroslaw Dobrowolski, Ola Sei, Islamic Monuments in Cairo: The Practical Guide American Univ in Cairo Press, 2002  

Bahri sultans
14th-century Mamluk sultans